Noam Chomsky (born 1928) is an American linguist and philosopher.

Chomsky may also refer to:


Language theory and linguistics
 Chomsky hierarchy
 Chomsky normal form
 Chomsky–Schützenberger theorem (disambiguation)

Books
 The Anti-Chomsky Reader, 2004
 Decoding Chomsky, 2016
 Noam Chomsky (Modern Masters), book by John Lyons
Noam Chomsky: A Life of Dissent, 1997 biography of Noam Chomsky written by Robert Barsky and published by The MIT Press

Other uses
 Chomsky (surname), a surname (including a list of people with the name)
 Chomsky (band), an American band

See also